Wake-Up Call is the fourteenth studio album of the Christian rock band, Petra. It was released on November 9, 1993. The album was one of the most successful for the band garnering them both a Grammy Award and a Dove Award.

The album marks a dramatic shift in tone for the band. The sound is more raw, there are fewer driving rock songs, and it concludes with three consecutive ballads.

Track listing 

All songs written by Bob Hartman, except where noted.
 "Midnight Oil" – 3:17
 "Good News" – 4:29
 "Strong Convictions" – 3:53
 "He's Been in My Shoes" – 4:22
 "Praying Man" (words by John Lawry, music by Lawry & Jim Cooper) – 4:25
 "Underneath the Blood" (music by Ronny Cates) – 3:30
 "Sleeping Giant" (music by Cates) – 5:28
 "Believer in Deed" – 4:06
 "Marks of the Cross" (music by Cates) – 4:35
 "Just Reach Out" (words & music by John Schlitt and Rich Gootee) – 4:28

Personnel 
Petra
 Bob Hartman – guitars
 John Schlitt – lead vocals
 John Lawry – keyboards
 Ronny Cates – bass
 Louie Weaver – drums

Backing vocals

 Michael Black
 Nanette Britt
 Bob Carlisle
 Vicki Carrico
 Chris Eddy
 Tommy Funderburk
 Ron Hemby
 Robert White Johnson
 Gordon Kennedy
 Joe Pizzulo
 Jimmie Lee Sloas
 Judson Spence
 Dale Thompson

Production

 Brown Bannister – producer, additional engineer
 Lynn Keesecker – A&R direction
 Jeff Balding – engineer at The Power Station, New York City; The Dugout, Nashville, Tennessee; Ocean Way Recording, Hollywood, California, mixing at Sixteenth Avenue Sound, Nashville, Tennessee; Ocean Way Recording
 Steve Bishir – additional engineer
 Rory Romano – assistant engineer
 Wayne Mehl – assistant engineer
 Martin Woodlee – assistant engineer
 Jeff Demorris – mix assistant
 Pete Martinez – mix assistant
 Greg Parker – mix assistant
 Doug Sax – mastering at The Mastering Lab, Hollywood, California
 Traci Sterling – production coordinator
 Diana Barnes – art direction
 Gabrielle Raumberger – design
 Michael Llewellyn – photography
 Dylan Tran – typography

Awards 

 Won Grammy Award for Best Rock Gospel Album in 1994.
 Won Dove Award for Rock Album of the Year at the 24th GMA Dove Awards in 1993.

References

1993 albums
Petra (band) albums
Albums produced by Brown Bannister
Grammy Award for Best Rock Gospel Album